Vivian Martin (July 22, 1893 – March 16, 1987) was an American stage and silent film actress.<ref>Fort Wayne, Indiana Journal Gazette, Vivian Martin In Merely Mary Ann Scores At Orpheum, Friday Morning, February 11, 1916, Page 20.</ref>The New York Times, Vivian Martin, March 23, 1987, Page B7.Olean, New York Evening Herald, Vivian Martin in Louisiana At The Gem Tonight, May 25, 1920, Page 14.

Biography
Martin was born in Sparta, Michigan and began her career as a child actress on the stage with comedian Lew Fields.

A winsome and pretty blonde, Martin entered the motion picture industry in 1914. Her first role was in The Wishing Ring: An Idyll of Old England (1914) for the World Film Company, in which she played Sally, a parson's daughter. Martin subsequently became a contract player for the Famous Players Film Company, where she achieved popularity as a rival to Mary Pickford. Among her other credits are The Third Kiss (1919), Her Official Fiancee (1919), The Innocent Adventuress (1919), and Louisiana (1919). She made forty-four movies in all, including some for the Fox Film Corporation.

In the early 1920s, Martin started her own production company and released her films through the Goldwyn Corporation. Her career entered into a downward spiral soon afterwards as a result of a lawsuit for payment of studio rentals. Although eventually settled out of court, the case did irreparable damage to her standing among her peers.

In April 1921 Martin left movies and returned to the stage. Her theatrical revival began with a three-act comedy entitled First Night Out by Adelaide Matthews and Ann Nichols.

Vivian Martin died in New York City in 1987, aged 93. Her obituary in the New York Times noted her philanthropy and association with the Professional Children's School in New York. She contributed to the lives of young performers as both a friend and benefactress.

Martin married actor William Jefferson in 1913; they eventually divorced. Several of Martin's early and rare films survive at the Library of Congress.

FilmographyThe Wishing Ring (1914)Old Dutch (1915)The Arrival of Perpetua (1915)An Indian Diamond (1915)The Little Miss Brown (1915)The Little Dutch Girl (1915)The Little Mademoiselle (1915)The Butterfly on the Wheel (1915)Over Night (1915)Merely Mary Ann (1916)
 A Modern Thelma (1916)The Stronger Love (1916)Her Father's Son (1916)The Right Direction (1916)The Wax Model (1917)The Spirit of Romance (1917)The Girl at Home (1917)Giving Becky a Chance (1917)Forbidden Paths (1917)A Kiss for Susie (1917)Little Miss Optimist (1917)The Trouble Buster (1917)The Sunset Trail (1917)Molly Entangled (1917)The Fair Barbarian (1917)A Petticoat Pilot (1918)Unclaimed Goods (1918)Viviette (1918)Her Country First (1918)Mirandy Smiles (1918)Jane Goes A-Wooing (1919)You Never Saw Such a Girl (1919)Little Comrade (1919)The Home Town Girl (1919)An Innocent Adventuress (1919)Louisiana (1919)The Third Kiss (1919)His Official Fiancée (1919)Husbands and Wives (1920)The Song of the Soul (1920)Mother Eternal (1921)Pardon My French (1921)
 Soiled (1925)Folies Bergere de Paris'' (1934) (uncredited role)

References

External links

 
 
 Silent Ladies and Gents features pictures of Vivian Martin
 Vivian Martin portrait gallery at NY Public Library, Billy Rose collection

1893 births
1987 deaths
American film actresses
American silent film actresses
American stage actresses
Actresses from Michigan
20th-century American actresses
People from Sparta, Michigan